Kropotkin is a biography of the Russian anarchist Peter Kropotkin written by historian Martin A. Miller and first published in 1976 by University of Chicago Press.

In comparison to the earlier Kropotkin biography, The Anarchist Prince, written by George Woodcock and Ivan Avakumović in 1950, Miller's Kropotkin was more comparatively more scholarly and critical, with a fuller bibliography.

References

Further reading 

 
 
 
 
 
 
 
 
 
 
 
 
 

1976 non-fiction books
Biographies about anarchists
English-language books
Books about Peter Kropotkin
University of Chicago Press books